Tricongius is a genus of South American long-spinneret ground spiders that was first described by Eugène Louis Simon in 1893.

Species
 it contains seven species:
 Tricongius amazonicus Platnick & Höfer, 1990 – Brazil
 Tricongius beltraoae (Brescovit & Ramos, 2003) – Brazil
 Tricongius collinus Simon, 1893 – Venezuela
 Tricongius granadensis Mello-Leitão, 1941 – Colombia
 Tricongius mutilatus (Mello-Leitão, 1940) – Argentina
 Tricongius ribaslangei (Bonaldo & Brescovit, 1997) – Brazil
 Tricongius ybyguara (Rheims & Brescovit, 2004) – Brazil

See also
 List of Prodidominae species

References

Araneomorphae genera
Prodidominae
Spiders of South America